is a 2018 Japanese animated fantasy film based on The Seven Deadly Sins manga series written and illustrated by Nakaba Suzuki. The film is directed by Yasuto Nishikata, with Noriyuki Abe as chief director, written by Makoto Uezu, and produced by A-1 Pictures. The film was released on August 18, 2018 in Japan and later released on November 29, 2018 in South Korea by MJ Pictures, and worldwide by Netflix on December 31, 2018.

A manga by the series' original author Nakaba Suzuki and a light novel of film adaptation by Shuka Matsuda was also released on August 18, 2018 in Japan.

The film marks the first film for the series, and was followed by Cursed by Light (2021), and Grudge of Edinburgh (2022-23).

Plot
The story takes place in a time when humans and non-humans alike lived in the same society. The Kingdom of Liones was almost annihilated thanks to the evildoings of the Demon Clan, but were saved thanks to the efforts of the Kingdom’s third Princess, Elizabeth, and a band of strong yet terrible knights known as The Seven Deadly Sins.

With peace returning to the Kingdom of Liones following its near annihilation by the Demon Race, Elizabeth and The Seven Deadly Sins decide to celebrate the King’s birthday with numerous dishes being prepared in the Boar Hat tavern. The Deadly Sins' leader Meliodas and his talking pig companion Hawk search for Skyfish for a recipe, ending up above the clouds and in front of the Sky Palace after stumbling across a well in the nearby forest which they discover is a portal. Living in the Sky Castle are a race of winged people known as the Celestials, descendants of the Goddess Race who hold watch over an Indura-type demon sealed in their land since the Ancient War's end 3,000 years ago. But when a group of demons calling themselves The Six Knights of Black attack the Celestials and release the Indura, forcing a Celestial youth named Solaad unintentionally bring Meliodas and Hawk to his people's land while he left to find the legendary white pig ‘Oshiro’ whose power was used to seal the evil. Solaad ends up meeting the other Deadly Sins, who mistook him for Meliodas due to their similar appearances, but manages to convince them to come with him while Meliodas went through a similar case of mistaken identity with the Celestials.

As The Seven Deadly Sins face the Six Knights of Black with support by the Celestials' warriors, it is revealed that the Knights of Black's leader Bellion is an upper-class demon who was denied membership into the Ten Commandments by Meliodas in the past. Meliodas ends up being mortally injured by the Winged Sword, a sacred sword forged specifically to harm demons. But Solaad, trusting The Seven Deadly Sins' insistence that Meliodas is a good person, removes the sword and revives Meliodas. Solaad then uses the Winged Sword and the combined power of his people, the Sins, and Elizabeth to destroy the Indura. The Sins are hailed as heroes and celebrate with the Celestials before taking a Skyfish and returning to Liones on Hawk's Mother, who is revealed to have been 'Oshiro' the entire time. Some time later, King is presented with the cooked Skyfish and is appalled by its horrible taste as Meliodas cooked it. Hawk decides to eat it for him and ends up assuming a Skyfish form to his shock.

Voice cast

Production
It is directed by Yasuto Nishikata and written by Makoto Uezu, featuring an original story by Nakaba Suzuki and Noriyuki Abe serving as chief director. The other main staff members returned from the anime series to reprise their roles in the film. The movie features three original characters called Solaad, Ellatte, and Bellion.

Release
Prisoners of the Sky was released in theaters in Japan on August 18, 2018 and in South Korea on November 29, 2018. The release of DVD and blu-ray in Japan by A-1 Pictures is scheduled for February 27, 2019 as per official site.
A dubbed version by Netflix was released worldwide on December 31, 2018.

Reception

Critical reception
Kim Morrissy of Anime News Network rated "B−" for Prisoners of the Sky by praising for best action animation & choreography in the series, great use of comic relief characters, some clever uses of the series lore but criticized for lackluster story & side characters underdevelopment. Morrissy concluded, "All in all, The Seven Deadly Sins: Prisoners of the Sky is a serviceably popcorn film that delivers about as much as you'd reasonably expect from a shonen filler film."

Box office
On opening weekend, The Seven Deadly Sins the Movie: Prisoners of the Sky opened in Japan in 271 theaters and sold 169,000 tickets to rank #5 at Domestic Box Office with opening . The anime film dropped from #5 to #10 in its second weekend the film earned 85,164,700 yen (about US$766,200) from Friday to Sunday, and earned a cumulative total of 427,180,300 yen (about US$3.84 million). Box Office Mojo stated that Anime Film overall grossed  from second weekend. However, after ranking fifth in its first weekend and 10th in its second weekend, "The Seven Deadly Sins the Movie: Prisoners of the Sky" quickly dropped off from the top 10 in its third weekend. The film still earned 51,475,900 Yen (about US$463,800) from Friday to Sunday, and has earned a cumulative total of 549,019,700 Yen (about US$4.94 million) and completed its theatrical run at Domestic Market.

Notes

References

External links
  
 
 

2018 films
2018 anime films
2018 action films
Anime films composed by Hiroyuki Sawano
Movie
A-1 Pictures
Aniplex
Japanese animated films
2010s Japanese-language films
Anime films based on manga
Films with screenplays by Makoto Uezu
Films directed by Noriyuki Abe
Seven deadly sins in popular culture

ja:七つの大罪 (漫画)#劇場版 七つの大罪 天空の囚われ人